The 1999 Rally Catalunya (formally the 35th Rallye Catalunya - Costa Brava) was the fifth round of the 1999 World Rally Championship. The race was held over three days between 19 and 21 April 1999.

Report 
The winner was Philippe Bugalski aboard a Citroën Xsara Kit Car, an unprecedented event in the world championship, since he won a front-wheel drive car, something that had not happened in years. The Kit Cars, which were supposed to be inferior compared to the all-wheel drive of the World Rally Cars, prevailed in asphalt rallies, first in Catalonia and later in the Corsica Rally that same year. The great weight/power ratio, accompanied by the good condition of the road surface and the good weather conditions in the Spanish test, made the Kit Cars prevail over their rivals.

Although Citroën did not officially compete in 1999, it had been developing the Citroën Xsara Kit Car for two years and after several tests in the nationals of Spain and France, it lined up two Xsaras for Bugalski and Jesús Puras in the Rally Catalunya. The Frenchman won the test, achieving the first victory of his career in the world championship. His victory aboard the Citroën Xsara Kit Car, a front-wheel drive car, raised some complaints among the official teams. Second was Didier Auriol with a Toyota Corolla WRC, which had already won the previous year, nothing could do against Bugalski's Xsara, although he finished half a minute behind his compatriot and third was Tommi Mäkinen, further away, with a Mitsubishi Lancer Evo VI , who was penalized one minute but kept third place ahead of Freddy Loix. The race could have been a one-two for Citroën, since on the first day it was dominated by Jesús Puras with the other Xsara Kit Car, who scored four scratches and led the race until in the first section of the second day he suffered an electrical fault in his car and had to leave. Bugalski relieved Puras at the head of the race and kept it until the end.

Among the most prominent retirements were Carlos Sainz, Auriol's teammate, who retired in the last section due to a fault with the alternator belt and Colin McRae who retired after the second day. It was also the debut in the world championship for the Frenchman Sébastien Loeb who ran with a Citroën Saxo but did not end up suffering an accident in section eight.

One of the most controversial moments outside the race was the confrontation on the sets of Canal+, which was broadcasting the race, between Jesús Puras and Juanjo Lacalle, Sainz's manager. Puras defended himself against the accusations of Luis Moya, Sainz's co-driver, of having trained illegally, and had a small verbal dispute with Lacalle.

Results

References

External links 
 Results at ewrc-results.com

Rally Catalunya
Rally Catalunya